This is an incomplete list of Sami dishes and other dishes related to the culture of the Sami people, which spans Norway, Sweden, Finland and Russia as well.

Description

Bread 
 Gáhkko - Soft flatbread, baked in a frying pan or on a flat stone.
 Gárrpa - Thin, crusty bread.
 Ståmpå - Loaf

Desserts 
 Cloudberries - Eaten both fresh and as jam. Cloudberry jam goes well warm with ice cream.
 Coffee with leipäjuusto
 Guompa - angelica mixed with milk and left in barrels to ferment.
 Gumppus - Blood cakes and blood sausages boiled with potatoes and meat.
 Jåbmå - Leaves of Mountain sorrel cooked to a stew, usually served with sugar and milk.

Fish dishes 
 Dried fish of different kinds
 Guollemales - Cooked fish of any kind.
 Sállteguolle - Salted fish, either gravsalted or heavy salted.
 Suovasguolle - Smoked fish

Meat dishes 
 Bierggomales - Cooked meat of various kind, chops and sides are common. Also tongue, marrow bones, liver are a part of the Sami cuisine. The dish is more like a five-course dinner, with various parts served in order with hot broth straight from the pot. 
 Bierggojubttsa - A soup containing meat, potatoes, carrots or other root vegetables.
 Guorppa - A kind of sausage made of minced meat wrapped in omentum.
 Gåjkkebierggo - Dried meat, eaten as it is or in soup with potato and rice.
 Mallemárffe - Blood sausage
 Sautéed reindeer
 Slåbbå - Blood pancakes
 Suovasbierggo - Smoked meat, eaten as it is or fried
 Smoked reindeer

See also
 Sami cuisine

References

External links
 Traditional Sami food by Samiskt Informationscentrum 

Cuisine by region
Finnish cuisine
Indigenous cuisine
Lists of foods by nationality
Norwegian cuisine
Russian cuisine

List
Swedish cuisine
Sámi-related lists